BSO may refer to:

Science and medicine
Bilateral salpingo-oophorectomy, the surgical removal of both ovaries and both fallopian tubes
Barents Sea Opening, an gateway to the Arctic Ocean
British School of Osteopathy, the United Kingdom's oldest osteopathic institution
Bismuth silicon oxide, a chemical compound that has bismuth, silicon, and oxygen
Buthionine sulfoximine, a chemical substance inhibiting glutathione synthesis
Brain storm optimization algorithm

Music
Baltimore Symphony Orchestra, Maryland, United States
Beijing Symphony Orchestra, Beijing, China
Berliner Sinfonie Orchester, Berlin, Germany
Bloomington Symphony Orchestra (Minnesota), United States
Bilkent Symphony Orchestra, Ankara, Turkey
Birmingham Symphony Orchestra, England
Boston Symphony Orchestra, Massachusetts, United States
The Brian Setzer Orchestra, a United States band of the late 1990s swing revival
British Symphony Orchestra, the name of a number of symphonic ensembles since c1905
Bournemouth Symphony Orchestra, Poole, Dorset, England

Other uses
BSO, a European information technology company founded by Eckart Wintzen, now a part of Atos
Baloch Students Organization, Balochistan, Pakistan
Bank of Syria and Overseas, Syria
Basco Airport, Batanes, Philippines
Basildon railway station, station code
Basque Statistics Office
Bicycle shaped object, a cheaply produced, poor quality bicycle sold in mainstream stores
Basilian Salvatorian Order, a Catholic monastic community in Lebanon
Black September Organization, a Palestinian militant group
Brake Standard Open, a designation of British railway carriage
Broward County Sheriff's Office, Florida, USA
Österreichische Bundes-Sportorganisation, the Austrian Federal Sports Organization
Buso language, the language spoken by a tribe in western Chad, by ISO 639 designation